The Battle of Freiburg, also called the Three Day Battle, took place on 3, 5 and 9 August 1644 as part of the Thirty Years' War. It took place between the French, consisting of a 20,000 men army, under the command of Louis II de Bourbon, Duc d'Enghien, and Henri de La Tour d'Auvergne, Viscount de Turenne, and a Bavarian-Imperial army of 16,800 men under Field Marshal Franz von Mercy. On 3 and 5 August, the French suffered heavy casualties despite having greater numbers. On the 9th, Turenne's army tried to flank the Bavarians by heading to Glottertal through Betzenhausen and cut off their supplies, while Mercy moved to St. Peter where they faced off against each other. The Bavarians repelled the attack of the French vanguard and retreated while leaving behind parts of their baggage and artillery. Having resulted in heavy casualties on both sides, the French side claimed victory because of the Bavarian retreat but the battle is also often seen as a draw  or a Bavarian tactical victory as the French army took much heavier casualties and failed their goal of relieving or retaking Freiburg. However, France gained a strategical advantage in the following campaign by leaving Freiburg behing and reaching the sparsely defended Upper Rhine region prior to Mercy and in consequence conquering large parts of it. 

The confrontation between France and Bavaria continued, leading to the subsequent battles of Herbsthausen and Nördlingen in 1645. This series of battles lasting since Tuttlingen 1643 signalled the nearing of the end of the Thirty Years' War. The huge losses suffered in Freiburg weakened both sides and were a huge factor that led to the Battle at Nördlingen, where Von Mercy was killed. The successors of Mercy were not as adept and efficient as he was, which led to Bavaria suffering multiple invasions in the following years. Maximilian, in the wake of the devastating invasion of 1646 temporarily withdrew from the war in the Truce of Ulm 1647.

Context 
The ongoing war in Germany had subsided for a little while after the Battle of Breitenfeld in 1642. During its resurgence, Jean-Baptiste Budes, Comte de Guébriant, led the French army towards Württemberg, and died while capturing Rottweil. Subsequently, under the new leadership of Marshal Josias Rantzau, the troops started heading towards Tuttlingen where they were attacked by the army of the Imperial-Bavarian army. Thus, on 24 November 1643, the Battle of Tuttlingen was fought between the French, under the command of Marshal Josias Rantzau and the alliance of the Bavarian, Imperial and Spanish troops led by Franz von Mercy and Johanne Von Werth. This ambush by the Bavarians took the French troops by surprise and were destroyed by a relatively smaller army of 18,000 Bavarians. The French suffered huge casualties, as approximately 4000 men were killed and 7000 wounded. They lost artillery and baggage and many men subsequently died of hunger after fleeing the battle, while the remainder retreated across the Rhine into Alsace. Josias Rantzau was then taken prisoner, and Rottweil was liberated from the French.

Following this battle, the French had to recall Field Marshal Viscomte De Turenne, as the troops were lacking a commander in Germany. Additionally, their stronghold in Germany started to weaken since their Swedish allies led by Lennart Torstensson were occupied in executing an attack against Denmark. While, on the other hand, Franz von Mercy started asserting dominance in Germany by seizing the Upper Rhine, Swabia and Breisgau.

Prelude 
The Duke of Bavaria, Maximilian I, decided to capitalise on the weakened force of the French by sending Von Mercy and his troops, on 15 April 1644, through the Black Forest towards Turenne, on the Rhine near Freiburg. Initially, on 11 May, Von Mercy besieged and captured the city of Überlingen on Lake Constance. After leaving a part of his force to guard the city, he moved on and arrived at Freiburg on 16 June. Due to the superior forces of the Bavarians at approximately 16000 men, and the French not being in the state to battle, it resulted in Von Mercy forcing the French garrison to hand the city over on 28 July while the French didn't have an option but to helplessly watch it occur.  To try and prevent this exact thing from happening, Cardinal Mazarin had sent the Duke of Enghien and his army of 10,000 troops to help the French protect Freiburg, but it did not arrive until the Bavarians were well set up in the mountains around the city, at Schonberg and Lorettoberg.

Battle 
On 2 August, reinforcements for the French arrived in the form of Louis II de Bourbon (Duc d'Enghien) and his army after supporting Gaston d'Orleans to take Gravelines on the Flemish coast. The Bavarians had already captured Freiburg when the Duke of Enghien arrived. The young Duke who took command decided to attack the Bavarians the following day.

Day One: 3 August 
In the French camp, several conflicts took place deciding the best strategy to attack. The Enghien decided to overrule other ideas which were designed to draw Mercy out of position and chose to execute a frontal attack. In fact, he was so confident of his strategy and his success that the attack was set a mere 3 hours before sunset, at 5pm. Therefore, On 3 August, at 5pm, the French attacked the Bavarians through two different angles. Turenne, along with 6000 men tried to attack through the rear of the Bavarians, which meant passing through the steep Black Forest. The challenging hillsides of the forest worked against the French and they failed to execute the flank before nightfall. D'Enghien on the other hand went ahead with the attack at 5pm, as 10,000 men started trekking the hills of Schonberg. D'Enghien's strategy however failed as the day ended up with French suffering heavy casualties at the hands of the Bavarians. Eventually, rain and nightfall halted the progress of the fight, ending the first day's battle in a stalemate. Von Mercy had the presence of mind to retract his troops who were not engaging in battle with Turenne at that time and set them up with a cannon in the north-east of the city.

Day Two: 5 August 
No battle was fought on the 4th, as the divided French army tried to regroup at Merzhausen and planned their next move. On 5 August, the French decided to attack in a direct way by sending several waves of men in Lorettoberg. Mercy capitalised on the uncoordinated attacks by the foe and decided to counter. Even though the French army fought admirably, they lost approximately half of their army. Von Mercy still had the city under Bavarian grasp, but they lost around one third of their troops as well.

Day Three: 9 August 
The battle did not take place on the 6th, 7th, and 8 August as both parties were in the process of restocking their supplies. The French obtained it through Breisach, whereas the Bavarians obtained it through Villingen. On the morning of 9 August, the French tried to execute a plan of cutting the supplies of the Bavarians by having Turenne and his troops move into Glottertal via Betzenhausen, while, the Enghien and his troops stayed put at Merzhausen. Their thinking being that this move would make Von Mercy either attack them or fall back and flee. However, Mercy proved to be one step ahead of the French, as on the same night, he had kept some troops at Lorettoberg in the sight of the enemy, which acted as a decoy/diversion while he and his remaining army started moving towards St. Peter to secure supplies and ammunition. They were however confronted by Turenne's army during their retreat, where they faced off against each other again. Even though this attack was evaded by the Bavarians, but only through witnessing several casualties, they managed to successfully retreat to Villingen. They were however forced to leave 3 guns and most of the baggage behind in order to retreat intact as they were not able to take charge of them.

The Battle in Hindsight 
Unlike the battles of Tuttlingen, which was the result of a surprise attack, the Battle of Freiburg was one in which the Bavarians had ample time to besiege the city and prepare for an attack from the French. In terms of the sources of intelligence for both parties, the French used spying in order to gain information about the Bavarians’ plans. For example, Mazarin had admitted to planting spies in Courts in Madrid and Vienna. Bavarians on the other hand did not have a network of spies in France. Thus, they resorted to using stationed ambassadors instead. However, Mazarin failed to capitalise on the information obtained by spies, as he underestimated the strength of Von Mercy's army in Rhine in 1644 after receiving reports about this matter. The French were however rescued of this mistake, as the Bavarians were very slow in moving across Rhine into Freiburg. Additionally, if Mazarin used his strategic reserves placed near the France's Northeast border to keep in contact with D'Enghien more efficiently, he could have prevented the siege of the city and many lives would have been spared.

Movement of large troops across the country was difficult to keep a secret. Thus, through newspapers and correspondents, Mercy was well aware that the Duke of Enghien was being recalled to support the French troops, which allowed him to assess the enemy's strength better. However, Maximilian failed to take advantage of the intelligence to gain territories on multiple occasions, as he was being very cautious due to the smaller size of his state and his army. Thus, Bavarians seldom engaged in battle without going through several procedures, like the war council, and several letters to Mercy and back. This caution prevented him to exploit their enemy's weakness in Freiburg, and forced them to retreat due to scarcity of food.

Aftermath and Significance 
The Battle ended with the Bavarians retreating to Villingen, having lost around 2,500 to 6,800 of their troops, while the French took advantage of their withdrawal by attempting to conquer the majority of the Rhine valley. In late 1644, they took over Worms, Oppenheim, Mainz, and Landau in quick succession. In early 1645, Von Mercy had sent 5000-8000 troops to assist the Imperials against the Swedes under Torstensson at Jankov. Turenne took advantage of this information and Mercy's weakened army by crossing the Rhine at Spires, with 10,500 of his troops. This offensive movement resulted in the Bavarians being forced to retreat deep into Swabia.  However, even while having the upper hand in the situation, Turenne made a grave mistake by asking his army to segregate in order to obtain supplies. Mercy read the situation and took advantage of this dispersed force by attacking and dominating the French at Herbsthausen, which made them retreat into Hesse-Cassel. This made Mazarin send D'Enghien to assist Turenne again after he helped Turenne in Freiburg, the French were also joined by the Hessian army. The strengthened force marched to the Bavarian borders into Alerheim, which resulted in the Battle of Nördlingen (also known as: Battle of Alerheim ). With assist from D'Enghien and the Hessians, Turenne defeated the Bavarians, after Mercy was killed in action.

The Bavarians in the latter part of the Thirty Years' War were stripped in numbers, and after the death of Von Mercy, were lacking a dominant and efficient commander to lead their remaining forces. As a result, Bavaria was a victim of two invasions in 1646 and 1648. Hence, the battles Bavaria contested in the 1640s led to the depletion in their forces, and which ultimately led to Maximilian temporarily withdrawing from the war.

Mazarin, on the other hand, after suffering defeats at Tuttlingen and Herbsthausen, pushed for peace talks in 1646, hoping to secure their assets in the Empire. This partially turned out in favour of them, as the French and the Bavarians signed the Treaty of Ulm on 14 March 1647.

Impact on Freiburg 
Battle of Freiburg, touted by many as the bloodiest battle of the Thirty Years' War, certainly had severe effects on the city of Freiburg. Not only did the Plague epidemic penetrate the city, killing more than 1000 citizens, but also the five invasions over 16 years, especially the most significant being the Bavarians’ invasion, left its citizens without enough food to survive. Its population reduced from 14,000 to 2,000 over the whole war. The Treaty of Westphalia was signed in 1648, which assigned the neighboring city and fortress Breisach on the Rhine to France, but by 1697, due to the Treaty of Ryswick, it was assigned back to Germany.

See also

 Battle of Tuttlingen
 Battle of Nördlingen
 History of Freiburg
 Thirty Years' War

Notes

References

Bibliography
 
 
 
 
 
 
 
 

1644 in the Holy Roman Empire
Battles of the Thirty Years' War
Battles involving France
Battles involving Bavaria
Conflicts in 1644